The Alberta Carbon Trunk Line (ACTL) is a  pipeline completed in July 2020, that will collect excess carbon dioxide (CO2) from the province of Alberta and transport it to various oil reservoirs around the province for enhanced oil recovery applications. Pioneered by Enhance Energy , the ACTL will source its CO2 from a fertilizer manufacturing plant in Redwater, and the North West Redwater Partnership bitumen upgrading plant using gasification. It will initially funnel the collected CO2 to Clive, a field discovered in the 1950s and currently produces about 300 barrels per day.

Expected specifications of captured CO2 
The ACTL is expected to be the world's largest carbon capture and storage project. It will store  of CO2 per year, six times more than the Weyburn project in Saskatchewan.

Timeline 
Plans for the ACTL began in 2004, but were put on hold due to the Great Recession in 2008. However, the ACTL was restarted after the recession with a license for construction and operation issued in April 2011. The ACTL was originally planned to start production in 2013, and delayed to 2015, and then finally delayed further. The pipeline is currently in its final stage of production as of November 2016. The ACTL has planned for CO2 injection to begin in early 2018.

Economics 
The project has been estimated to cost CAN$1.2 billion but will find approximately CAN$558 million from several energy funds and carbon capture technology initiatives. Over 15 years, the Alberta province will be funding the project with CAN$495 million from the Alberta CCS Fund. The Canadian government is giving a total of CAN$63 million: CAN$30 million from the Clean Energy Fund and CAN$33 million from ecoENERGY Technology Initiative.

References 

Buildings and structures in Alberta
Petroleum production
Petroleum industry in Canada